Iva may refer to:
 Iva Marín Adrichem (1998), Dutch-Icelandic singer
 Iva Bigelow Weaver (1875-1932), American soprano singer, music educator
 Iva Bittová (born 1958), Czech avant-garde violinist, singer and composer
 Iva Budařová (born 1960), Czech former professional tennis player
 Iva Davies (born 1955), Australian musician, leader of the band Icehouse
 Iva Frühlingová (born 1982), Czech singer and model
 Iva Hercíková (1935 - 2007), Czech author
 Iva Janžurová (born 1941), Czech actress
 Iva Majoli (born 1977), Croatian former professional tennis player
 Iva Pekárková (born 1963), Czech author
 Iva Ritschelová (1964–2017), Czech economist
 Iva Roglić (born 1988), Serbian basketball player
 Iva Ropati, New Zealand former professional rugby league footballer
 Iva Snyder, fictional character on the daytime soap opera As the World Turns
 Iva Zanicchi (born 1940), Italian pop singer and politician

Croatian feminine given names
Serbian feminine given names